Uebelmannia is genus of cactus.

Description
Species in the genus Uebelmannia grow individually and practically never branch. Their spherical to cylindrical shoots reach heights of growth of up to 75 centimeters. The epidermis is smooth, papillate, granular or covered with squamous deposits of wax. The numerous ribs are mostly sharp-edged, but sometimes also divided into bumps. 2 to 7 spines arise from the areoles, which are arranged protruding to spread out or comb-shaped. They can be straight or slightly curved.

The small, short, funnel-shaped flowers are yellow. They appear near the shoot tip and open during the day. The flower tube are covered with a few areoles, from which dense wool and few bristles arise.

The spherical to cylindrical, yellow or red, berry-shaped fruits are bare at the base and covered with wool and bristles towards the top. They are thin-walled, dry when ripe and have no remains of flowers. The fruits contain cap-shaped, shiny black to reddish-brown seeds.

Species
It was named after the Swiss collector Werner J. Uebelmann (1921-2014).

References

External links

 
Cactoideae genera